Udayawansha Parakrama (born 6 March 1996) is a Sri Lankan cricketer. He made his Twenty20 debut for Sri Lanka Air Force Sports Club in the 2017–18 SLC Twenty20 Tournament on 24 February 2018. He made his List A debut for Tincomalee District in the 2016–17 Districts One Day Tournament on 18 March 2017.

References

External links
 

1996 births
Living people
Sri Lankan cricketers
Sri Lanka Air Force Sports Club cricketers
Tincomalee District cricketers
Place of birth missing (living people)